"Thinking About You" is the first single from Norah Jones' 2007 album Not Too Late. It was her first single to enter the Billboard Hot 100 in 4 years, since "Don't Know Why".

Background and composition 
Jones wrote "Thinking About You" in 1999 with Ilhan Ersahin, her then-bandmate in Wax Poetic. She said the song had "always been in the back of my mind", but she thought it was too much of a pop song for her and preferred if someone else were to record it.  She recorded a version of it for her second album, Feels like Home (2004), but according to her it sounded "too country-rock". According to the producer, she "found a way to make it work" during the recording of Not Too Late.

Critical reception 
Stephen Thomas Erlewine from AllMusic picked the song among the best tracks on the album, calling it a "wonderful laid-back soul". Sia Michel from Entertainment Weekly called it a "safety-net single", with its sexy, cocktail-party swing, the tune could be her first real radio hit since 'Don't Know Why'." Neil Spencer from The Observer commented that the song "looks like a conscious attempt not to scare the punters." Tom Woods called it "a lovely pop song, with nostalgic lyrics." Tyler Fisher from Sputnikmusic commented that the song is "a western jazz hybrid in the truest sense, with very country-styled melodies from the organ and Wurlitzer, but the jazzy horn section provides great countermelodies."

Track listing

CD single
Europe
"Thinking About You"
"2 Men"
"Wish I Could"

Commercial release and chart performance
Released in the United States on December 5, 2006 (see 2006 in music), "Thinking About You" was one of the first songs by a major artist to be available for paid digital download in mp3 format. The single entered the U.S. Billboard Hot 100 at number eighty-two in early February 2007, becoming Jones's first chart entry since "Don't Know Why" (2002). It was also her second single to appear on the Billboard Hot 100 chart. It peaked at number seventy in Germany.

Music video 
The music video, directed by Ace Norton, was filmed on a soundstage at Steiner Studios in Brooklyn, New York with a cast of eight people, including Jones. According to videostatic.com, it contains elements from some of Norton's previous videos — for Peter Walker's "What Do I Know" (the "within the within" effect),  Death Cab for Cutie's "Someday You Will Be Loved" (the animated heart) and Death Cab for Cutie's "Crooked Teeth" (the Claymation). The video premiered on December 19, 2006.

Cover versions
Irma Thomas recorded the song for her 2008 album Simply Grand.  Jones performed as a guest pianist on the recording.

Charts

References

2006 singles
Norah Jones songs
Songs written by Norah Jones
2006 songs
Blue Note Records singles